Motul is a small city in Motul Municipality in the Mexican state of Yucatán, located some  east of Mérida. The city serves as the municipal seat. In the census of 2005 the population of the town of Motul was 21,508 people, while the municipality had a population of 31,547, living on an area of 297.63 km² (114.92 sq mi).

History 
Motul was a site of the Pre-Columbian Maya civilization, said to have been founded in the 11th century by a priest named Zac Mutul. The city was ruled by the Pech family. After the fall of Yucatán's central government in Mayapan in the 1440s, the Pech ruled a regional kingdom called Cehpech with its capital in Motul.

With the Spanish conquest of Yucatán, Conquistador Francisco de Montejo made Motul a Spanish colonial town. Motul has a Spanish colonial era Franciscan monastery with interesting frescos.

Motul was granted the status of a city on 22 February 1872.

Motul was the birthplace of Felipe Carrillo Puerto, a former Governor of Yucatán who was assassinated in 1924. In his honor, the formal name of the city of Motul was changed to Motul de Carrillo Puerto.

Motul is known as the place of origin of the popular dish huevos motuleños (eggs Motul style).

References
Link to tables of population data from Census of 2005 INEGI: Instituto Nacional de Estadística, Geografía e Informática
Yucatán Enciclopedia de los Municipios de México

External links
 

Populated places in Yucatán
Populated places established in the 11th century
11th-century establishments in Mexico